Shut-in may refer to:

People
A shut-in is a person confined indoors, especially as a result of physical or mental disability
 Agoraphobe
 Recluse
 Invalid, or patient
 Hikikomori, a Japanese term for reclusive adolescents or adults who withdraw from social life

Geography
Shut-in (river), a river that's naturally confined within a deep, narrow channel
 Shut-in Creek, a creek in Missouri, US

Film
Intruders (2015 film), a thriller starring Beth Riesgraf, also known as Shut In
Shut In (2016 film), a thriller starring Naomi Watts
Shut In (2022 film), a thriller starring Rainey Qualley, Josh Horowitz, and Vincent Gallo

Other uses
Shut-in (oil drilling), the implementation of a production cap lower than the available output at a particular site
"The Shut-In!", an episode of Amphibia

See also

 
 Shut (disambiguation)
 In (disambiguation)